Prečín is a village and municipality in Považská Bystrica District in the Trenčín Region in North-Western Slovakia.

History
The first mention of the municipality in historical records is dated 1385.
There are two churches, one from the 16th century and another from the 19th century.

Geography
The municipality lies at an altitude of 337 metres and covers an area of 17.631 km2. It has a population of about 1393 people. Prečín is surrounded by forests ideal for hiking and well as climbable rock formations.

References

External links

 
http://www.statistics.sk/mosmis/eng/run.html

Villages and municipalities in Považská Bystrica District